Taínos is a 2005 Puerto Rican film written and directed by Benjamín López. The film follows Sara Cordero (Miró), a young archaeology student, who organizes an expedition to La Mora Cave in the town of Comerío with three friends. A young and mysterious man called Yabey (Reyes) offers to guide her expedition. As they venture deeper into the forest, they discover a tribe of Taíno Indians living away from civilization. This event and other circumstances spark a series of conflicts that divide and endanger the whole group.

Cast
 Christie Miró - Sara Cordero
 Josué Reyes - Yabey
 Danny Fraticelli - Harold
 Sharon Nytaína - Nora
 Karina Guerra - Marilyn
 Ferrán Galindo - Tico
 Roberto Roman - Yani

See also
Cinema of Puerto Rico
List of films set in Puerto Rico

References

External links
 

2005 films
Puerto Rican films
2000s Spanish-language films
2005 action films